Lee Weaver (born April 10, 1930) is an American film and television actor.

Early life
Weaver was born in Fort Lauderdale, Florida, the son of Josephine and Primus Jest Weaver, a chef.

Weaver was the voice of Alpine in the animated television series G.I. Joe: A Real American Hero (1985–1986). Weaver played friend of George Jefferson on "The Jeffersons" season three episode 16 "George's Guilt" (1977). Weaver was also the original mailman on 227 (1985). Weaver played the role of Ricardo in the television series Easy Street (1986–1987). He appeared as a blind seer in the film O Brother, Where Art Thou? (2000) and he also appeared in one episode of One World (2000), a situation-comedy television series. Weaver had a guest appearance on an episode of The Cosby Show as a waiter. He appeared as a Junkyard Owner in an episode of It's Always Sunny in Philadelphia.

He also played the role of Ed Downer, a handyman who became an interest of Philip Banks' mom, on an episode of The Fresh Prince of Bel-Air. Perhaps his most memorable role was the exuberant exhibitionist "Buck Naked," who enlivened episodes of Steven Bochco's police dramas, Hill Street Blues and NYPD Blue.

Personal life
Since July 10, 1971, Weaver has been married to actress Ta-Tanisha and they have one child together. He and his wife reside in The Bronx, New York, where Ta-Tanisha was born and raised.

Weaver was a childhood friend of Cannonball Adderley, and served as the best man at his wedding. On his 1963 album Nippon Soul, Adderley introduces the Yusef Lateef composition "The Weaver" as "dedicated to a...dear friend of everyone in the band, kind of a jive cat, but a beautiful cat. His name is Weaver, Lee Weaver. So the tune sounds somethin' like Lee Weaver. It's soulful, it's mean."

Filmography

Film

Television

References

External links 
 

1930 births
Living people
Male actors from Florida
American male film actors
People from the Bronx
Male actors from Fort Lauderdale, Florida
American male voice actors
20th-century American male actors
African-American male actors
American male television actors
20th-century African-American people
21st-century African-American people